Each "article" in this category is a collection of entries about several stamp issuers, presented in alphabetical order. The entries are formulated on the micro model and so provide summary information about all known issuers.  

See the :Category:Compendium of postage stamp issuers page for details of the project.

Kiaochow 

Refer 	Kiautschou

Kiautschou 

Dates 	1901–1914
Currency 	(1901) 100 pfennige = 1 mark
		(1905) 100 cents = 1 dollar

Refer 	German Colonies

King Edward VII Land 

Dates 	1908 only
Currency 	12 pence = 1 shilling; 20 shillings = 1 pound

Refer 	New Zealand Territories

Kingdom of Serbs Croats & Slovenes 

Refer 	Yugoslavia

Kingdom of Yugoslavia 

Refer 	Yugoslavia

Kionga 

Dates 	1916 only
Currency 	100 centavos = 1 escudo

Refer 	Mozambique Territories

Kirgizistan 

Refer 	Kyrgyzstan

Kiribati 

Dates 	1979 –
Capital 	Tarawa
Currency 	100 cents = 1 dollar

Main Article  Postage stamps and postal history of Kiribati

Includes 	Gilbert Islands

See also 	Gilbert & Ellice Islands

Kirin & Heilungkiang 

Dates 	1927–1931
Capital 	Harbin
Currency 	100 cents = 1 dollar

Refer 	Chinese Provinces

Kishangarh 

Dates 	1899–1947
Currency 	12 pies = 1 anna; 16 annas = 1 rupee

Refer 	Indian Native States

Kithyra (Cythera) 

Refer 	Ionian Islands

Klaipėda 

Dates 	1923 only
Currency 	(1923) 100 pfennige = 1 mark
		(1923) 100 centu = 1 litas

Main Article Needed 

See also 	Lithuania;
		Memel (French Administration)

Kolchak Government (Siberia) 

Dates 	1919–1920
Capital 	Omsk
Currency 	100 kopecks = 1 Russian ruble

Refer 	Russian Civil War Issues

Komotini 

Refer 	Gumultsina

Korce (Koritza) 

Dates 	1917–1919
Capital 	Koritza
Currency 	100 centimes = 1 franc

Refer 	French Occupation Issues

Korea (Empire) 

Dates 	1884–1910
Capital 	Seoul
Currency 	(1884) 10 mons = 1 poon
		(1899) 1000 re = 100 cheun = 1 won

Main Article  Postage stamps and postal history of Korea

Korea (Indian Custodian Forces) 

Dates 	1953 only
Currency 	12 pies = 1 anna; 16 annas = 1 rupee

Refer 	Indian Overseas Forces

Korea (Japanese Post Offices) 

Dates 	1900–1901
Currency 	10 rin = 1 sen; 100 sen = 1 yen

Refer 	Japanese Post Offices Abroad

Koritza 

Refer 	Korce (Koritza)

Korytza 

Refer 	Epirus

Kos 

Dates 	1912–1932
Capital 	Kos
Currency  	100 centesimi = 1 lira

Refer 	Aegean Islands (Dodecanese)

Kotor 

Refer 	Dalmatia (German Occupation)

Kouang-Tcheou 

Dates 	1898–1943
Currency 	(1898) 100 centimes = 1 franc
		(1919) 100 cents = 1 piastre

Refer 	China (Indochinese Post Offices)

Krk 

Refer 	Veglia

Kuban Territory 

Dates 	1918–1920
Capital 	Krasnodar
Currency 	100 kopecks = 1 Russian ruble

Refer 	Russian Civil War Issues

K-u-K Feldpost 

Refer 	Austro-Hungarian Military Post

Kupa 

Refer 	Fiume & Kupa Zone (Italian Occupation)

Kuwait 

Dates 	1923 –
Capital 	Kuwait City
Currency  	(1923) 12 pies = 1 anna, 16 annas = 1 rupee
		(1957) 100 naye paise = 1 rupee
		(1961) 1000 fils = 1 dinar

Main article  Postage stamps and postal history of Kuwait

See also 	British Postal Agencies in Eastern Arabia

Kwangchow 

Refer 	Kouang-Tcheou

Kwangtung (Japanese Occupation) 

Dates 	1942–1945
Currency 	100 cents = 1 dollar

Refer 	Japanese Occupation Issues

Kwidzyn 

Refer 	Marienwerder

Kyrgyzstan 

Dates 	1992 –
Capital 	Bishkek (formerly known as Frunze)
Currency 	(1992) 100 kopecks = 1 Russian ruble
		(1993) 100 tyin = 1 som

Main article Postage stamps and postal history of Kyrgyzstan
See also 	Union of Soviet Socialist Republics (USSR)

References

Bibliography
 Stanley Gibbons Ltd, Europe and Colonies 1970, Stanley Gibbons Ltd, 1969
 Stanley Gibbons Ltd, various catalogues
 Stuart Rossiter & John Flower, The Stamp Atlas, W H Smith, 1989
 XLCR Stamp Finder and Collector's Dictionary, Thomas Cliffe Ltd, c.1960

External links
 AskPhil – Glossary of Stamp Collecting Terms
 Encyclopaedia of Postal History

Kiaochow